Veijo-Lassi Holopainen (26 June 1921 – 8 January 2006) was a Finnish field hockey player. He competed in the men's tournament at the 1952 Summer Olympics.

References

External links
 

1921 births
2006 deaths
Finnish male field hockey players
Olympic field hockey players of Finland
Field hockey players at the 1952 Summer Olympics
People from Kuopio
Sportspeople from North Savo